The 2013 Indoor Football League season was the fifth season of the Indoor Football League (IFL). Playing with nine teams in two conferences spread across the United States, the league's regular season kicked off on February 15, 2013, when the Sioux Falls Storm beat the Green Bay Blizzard 64–41. The season ended on June 15, 2013, with the visiting Sioux Falls Storm defeating the Texas Revolution 52-38.

Teams
For 2013, the IFL maintained its two-conference no-divisions format with each team scheduled to play 14 games during the 16-week regular season. The league contracted from 16 teams to just nine with the Bloomington Edge, Lehigh Valley Steelhawks, Omaha Beef, Reading Express, Everett Raptors, New Mexico Stars, and Wichita Wild either folding, hibernating, or moving to a different league. A new team, the Cheyenne Warriors, were expected to join the league for 2013 until the death of the team's owner in late December 2012; the team subsequently became inactive. The Texas-based Allen Wranglers changed ownership and became the Texas Revolution.

United Conference

Intense Conference

Personnel
Robert Loving served as interim commissioner of the IFL in 2012 after Tommy Benizio left mid-season to pursue other opportunities. Benizio became president of the Texas Revolution, an IFL franchise based in Allen, Texas. Loving was officially named as the IFL's commissioner by the league's board of directors during the 2012 annual league meetings.

For 2013, Michael Allshouse was Director of Football Operations, Sean Whitmire was Director of Communications/Team Services, and Tom Falcinelli was the Director of Officiating.

Standings

Playoffs

Awards

Individual season awards

1st Team All-IFL

2nd Team All-IFL

References